The 2008 season was the Minnesota Vikings' 48th in the National Football League (NFL) and their third under head coach Brad Childress. They won their 17th NFC North division title with a 10–6 record, the first time since 2000 that they made the playoffs with a winning record; however, they finished behind the New York Giants and Carolina Panthers and had to play in the wild card round of the playoffs. They were paired with Childress's former team, the Philadelphia Eagles, who won 26–14. Second-year running back Adrian Peterson led the league in rushing with 1,760 yards.

Offseason

Player and personnel moves

Releases and injuries
On February 11, it was announced that defensive end Kenechi Udeze had been diagnosed by doctors with a form of leukemia. KMSP-TV also reported that Udeze was at Fairview Southdale Hospital undergoing tests and that he had been at the Mayo Clinic in Rochester the week before. Udeze was expected to be out for the 2008 season, but returned for one game against the Green Bay Packers on November 9 before ultimately retiring from professional football on July 29, 2009.

On February 20, the team released free safety Dwight Smith after two somewhat controversial seasons with the Vikings in which Smith had several run-ins with the law. He was due to receive $2.5 million and a $500,000 roster bonus this season.

On February 27, the team released backup quarterback Kelly Holcomb.

On February 29, the team traded wide receiver Troy Williamson to the Jacksonville Jaguars for a sixth-round pick in the 2008 draft
 and linebacker Dontarrious Thomas left the team to join the San Francisco 49ers.

On March 1, the Vikings' former defensive tackle Spencer Johnson joined the Buffalo Bills.

On March 3, free agent running back Mewelde Moore left the team to join the Pittsburgh Steelers.

On March 7, safety Tank Williams joined the New England Patriots and fullback Tony Richardson joined the New York Jets.

Signings and extensions
On February 29, the team signed safety Madieu Williams, formerly of the Cincinnati Bengals, and fullback Thomas Tapeh, formerly of the Philadelphia Eagles.

On March 1, the team signed wide receiver Bernard Berrian, formerly of the Chicago Bears.

On March 4, running back and special teams specialist Maurice Hicks, formerly of the San Francisco 49ers, signed a three-year contract to join the team.

On March 14, the team signed linebacker and special-teams standout Derrick Pope, formerly of the Miami Dolphins.

On March 17, the Vikings signed former Seattle Seahawks defensive tackle Ellis Wyms, and re-signed wide receiver Robert Ferguson; all to one-year contracts.

On March 20 and March 21, Houston Texans safety Michael Boulware and former Green Bay Packers career backup defensive tackle Kenderick Allen to one-year contracts.

On March 24, restricted free agent linebacker Heath Farwell was re-resigned to a one-year contract. Also, on the next day, the team signed former Kansas City Chiefs cornerback Benny Sapp to a one-year contract.

On April 8, former Vikings backup quarterback Gus Frerotte rejoined the team on a one-year contract.

On April 23, Kansas City Chiefs defensive end Jared Allen signed a six-year contract with the Vikings in a trade that gave the Chiefs the Vikings' 2008 first-round draft pick and both third-round picks. The trade may also involve the swapping of 2008 sixth round draft picks with Kansas City.

On July 22, the Vikings signed their fifth-round pick, defensive tackle Letroy Guion, and their seventh-round pick, wide receiver Jaymar Johnson.

Draft

Note: All selections were moved up one overall position as the New England Patriots forfeited their first-round pick due to the "Spygate scandal"
 The Vikings traded their first-, third- and sixth-round selections (17th, 82nd and 182nd overall), and the third-round selection they acquired from the Broncos (73rd overall) to the Kansas City Chiefs in exchange for Kansas City's sixth-round selection (187th overall) and DE Jared Allen.
 The Vikings traded their second- and fourth-round selections (47th and 117th overall) to the Philadelphia Eagles in exchange for Philadelphia's second- and fifth-round selections (43rd and 152nd overall).
 The Vikings traded their 2007 fourth-round selection (121st overall) to the Denver Broncos in exchange for Denver's 2007 sixth- and seventh-round selections (176th and 233rd overall), and 2008 third-round selection (73rd overall).
 The Vikings traded their fifth- and seventh-round selections (150th and 209th overall) to the Green Bay Packers in exchange for the fifth-round selection Green Bay acquired from the St. Louis Rams (137th overall).
 The Vikings traded WR Troy Williamson to the Jacksonville Jaguars in exchange for Jacksonville's sixth-round selection (193rd overall).
 The Vikings traded OT Adam Goldberg to the St. Louis Rams in exchange for St. Louis' seventh-round selection (209th overall).
 The Vikings traded their seventh-round selection (226th overall) and DT C. J. Mosley to the New York Jets in exchange for QB Brooks Bollinger.

Undrafted free agents

Training camp

On May 27, Erasmus James was traded to the Washington Redskins for a conditional 2009 NFL draft pick.

On June 27, the Vikings signed a one-day contract with seven-season member Robert Griffith so he could ceremonially retire as a member of the team.

On July 16, Jay Glazer reported that the Green Bay Packers had filed tampering charges against the Vikings for allegedly inappropriately contacting Green Bay quarterback Brett Favre.

On August 4, NFL commissioner Roger Goodell ruled that contact between the Vikings and Brett Favre over the summer did not violate league tampering rules, as the Packers alleged, mostly because Favre was retired at the time.

Preseason

Schedule

Game summaries

Week 1: vs. Seattle Seahawks

Week 2: at Baltimore Ravens

Week 3: vs. Pittsburgh Steelers

Week 4: at Dallas Cowboys

Regular season

Schedule

Game summaries

Week 1: at Green Bay Packers

The Vikings began their 2008 campaign on the road against their NFC North foe, the Green Bay Packers, in the first game of 2008's Monday Night Football doubleheader. After a scoreless first quarter, the Vikings attacked first with kicker Ryan Longwell getting a 37-yard field goal. The Packers responded with quarterback Aaron Rodgers completing a 1-yard touchdown pass to fullback Korey Hall, along with kicker Mason Crosby getting a 42-yard field goal. In the third quarter, the Vikes tried to catch up as Longwell got a 27-yard field goal, but Green Bay replied with cornerback Will Blackmon returning a punt 76 yards for a touchdown. In the fourth quarter, Minnesota tried to rally as quarterback Tarvaris Jackson completed a 23-yard touchdown pass to wide receiver Sidney Rice (with a failed two-point conversion), yet the Packers responded with Rodgers getting a 1-yard touchdown run. The Vikes replied with a 3-yard touchdown run from running back Adrian Peterson, but their final rally ended in an interception.

With the loss, not only did the Vikings begin their season at 0–1, but head coach Brad Childress fell to 0–5 against the Packers in his coaching career. In the first half, Minnesota was widely outgained in passing yards 139–6.

Week 2: vs. Indianapolis Colts

Hoping to rebound from their divisional road loss to the Packers, the Vikings played their Week 2 home opener against the Indianapolis Colts. In the first half, kicker Ryan Longwell helped Minnesota take the early lead with a 45-yard and a 27-yard field goal in the first quarter, along with a 53-yard field goal in the second quarter. In the third quarter, the Vikes increased its lead with Longwell getting a 46-yard and a 28-yard field goal. However, the Colts responded with running back Joseph Addai getting a 1-yard touchdown run. In the fourth quarter, Indianapolis continued to gain ground as quarterback Peyton Manning completed a 32-yard touchdown pass to wide receiver Reggie Wayne, followed by a two-point conversion run by running back Dominic Rhodes. The Colts sealed the win with a 47-yard field goal from kicker Adam Vinatieri with 3 seconds left in regulation.

Week 3: vs. Carolina Panthers

Trying to avoid an 0–3 start, the Vikings stayed at home for a Week 3 duel with the Carolina Panthers. Due to poor performance, Jackson was benched at quarterback in favor of veteran Gus Frerotte.

In the first quarter, Minnesota trailed early as Panthers kicker John Kasay got a 43-yard field goal. In the second quarter, Carolina increased its lead with running back Jonathan Stewart getting a 2-yard touchdown run. The Vikes responded with a 28-yard field goal by Longwell, followed by cornerback Antoine Winfield sacking Panthers quarterback Jake Delhomme, who fumbled the ball, which Winfield returned 19 yards for a touchdown just before halftime, the key play in the Vikings' victory. Head coach Brad Childress said a day later that Winfield had a half-second left before it was ruled an incomplete pass. In the third quarter, the Vikings got the lead as Frerotte completed a 34-yard touchdown pass to tight end Visanthe Shiancoe. In the fourth quarter, Minnesota sealed its victory with Longwell nailing a 32-yard field goal.

Week 4: at Tennessee Titans

Coming off their home win over the Panthers, the Vikings flew to LP Field for a Week 4 interconference duel with the Tennessee Titans. In the first quarter, Minnesota trailed early as Titans kicker Rob Bironas got a 20-yard field goal, while running back Chris Johnson got a 1-yard touchdown run. In the second quarter, the Vikes responded with a 28-yard touchdown run from Peterson. However, Tennessee responded with Bironas kicking a 32-yard field goal, along with running back LenDale White getting a 1-yard touchdown run. The Vikings closed out the half with Longwell getting a 42-yard field goal.

In the third quarter, the Titans increased their lead with Bironas nailing a 49-yard field goal. In the fourth quarter, Minnesota tried to rally as Peterson got a 3-yard touchdown run, but Tennessee pulled away with Johnson's 6-yard touchdown run.

With the loss, the Vikings fell to 1–3.

Week 5: at New Orleans Saints

Hoping to rebound from their road loss to the Titans, the Vikings flew to the Louisiana Superdome for a Week 5 Monday night duel with the New Orleans Saints. Frerotte made his first start on Monday Night Football since 1997, when he was with the Washington Redskins.

In the first quarter, the Vikes trailed early as Saints quarterback Drew Brees completed a 17-yard touchdown pass to wide receiver Devery Henderson. Minnesota responded with Winfield returning a blocked field goal 59 yards for a touchdown, the first such score in franchise history. New Orleans answered with kicker Martín Gramática getting a 35-yard field goal, yet the Vikings replied with Longwell getting a 53-yard field goal. In the second quarter, the Vikes took the lead on a trick play as running back Chester Taylor completed a 4-yard touchdown pass to Shiancoe, along with Longwell kicking a 33-yard field goal.

In the third quarter, the Saints began to rally as running back Reggie Bush returned a punt 71 yards for a touchdown. In the fourth quarter, New Orleans took the lead with Gramática's 53-yard field goal and Bush's 64-yard punt return for a touchdown. Afterwards, Minnesota answered with Frerotte completing a 33-yard touchdown pass to wide receiver Bernard Berrian, along with Longwell nailing the game-winning 30-yard field goal.

With the win, the Vikings improved to 2–3.

Winfield had a big game. In addition to his touchdown off of a blocked field goal, he had 8 tackles and a sack (with a forced fumble recovery).

This was also the first time in NFL history that a game had a combination of a blocked field goal, a touchdown pass by a non-quarterback, two field goals of 50+ yards, and two punts returned for touchdowns.

Week 6: vs. Detroit Lions

Coming off their Monday night road win over the Saints, the Vikings went home for a Week 6 NFC North duel with the Detroit Lions. In the first quarter, the Vikings got an early lead as Lions quarterback Dan Orlovsky unintentionally ran out of the back of his own end zone, giving Minnesota a safety. In the second quarter, Detroit got the lead as kicker Jason Hanson made a 40-yard field goal. In the third quarter, the Lions increased their lead as Orlovsky completed a 12-yard touchdown pass to wide receiver Calvin Johnson. The Vikings answered with an 86-yard touchdown pass from Frerotte to Berrian. In the end of the fourth quarter, the Vikings got in field goal range due to a controversial pass interference call on Leigh Bodden. The Vikings sealed the win with Longwell nailing the game-winning 26-yard field goal.

With the win, the Vikings improved to 3–3.

Week 7: at Chicago Bears

Coming off their divisional home win over the Lions, the Vikings flew to Soldier Field for a Week 7 NFC North duel with the Chicago Bears. In the first quarter, the Vikes drew first blood as Peterson got a 1-yard touchdown run. The Bears responded with quarterback Kyle Orton completing an 18-yard touchdown pass to tight end Greg Olsen, along with running back Garrett Wolfe returning a blocked punt 17 yards for a touchdown. Minnesota responded with a 24-yard touchdown pass from Frerotte to Shiancoe. In the second quarter, it was back and forth. Chicago kicker Robbie Gould kicked a 26-yard field goal, while Longwell got a 42-yard field goal for the Vikings. Bears cornerback Zack Bowman recovered a fumble in Minnesota's endzone for a touchdown, but the Vikings canceled it out on a 1-yard touchdown run by Taylor. Chicago closed out the half as Gould got a 48-yard field goal.

In the third quarter, the Bears got the lead again as wide receiver Rashied Davis recovered a fumble in Minnesota's endzone for a touchdown. The Vikes replied as Peterson got a 54-yard touchdown run. Chicago then struck again, as Orton completed a 51-yard touchdown pass to wide receiver Marty Booker. In the fourth quarter, the Bears struck again as running back Matt Forte got a 1-yard touchdown run. Minnesota tried to rally as Longwell nailed a 23-yard field goal, along with Frerotte completing a 5-yard touchdown pass to Berrian. However, Chicago's defense stepped up and prevented the Vikes from tying the game, intercepting Frerotte one more time.

With the loss, the Vikings went into their bye week at 3–4.

The 89 combined points is the most in a single game in the history of both franchises.

Week 9: vs. Houston Texans

Coming off their bye week, the Vikings played a Week 9 interconference duel at home against the Houston Texans. In the first quarter, the Vikes drew first blood as Peterson got a 1-yard touchdown run. The Texans responded with cornerback Jacques Reeves returning an interception 44 yards for a touchdown. In the second quarter, Minnesota responded with a pair of touchdown passes from Frerotte: first, an 8-yard pass to Rice and then a 49-yard pass to Berrian.

In the third quarter, Houston started to rally as quarterback Sage Rosenfels completed a 3-yard touchdown pass to wide receiver David Anderson. In the fourth quarter, the Vikings answered with Frerotte completing a 25-yard touchdown pass to Shiancoe. The Texans tried to come back as Rosenfels completed a 14-yard touchdown pass to wide receiver Andre Johnson. Fortunately, Minnesota's defense stiffened for the victory.

With the win, the Vikings improved to 4–4.

Week 10: vs. Green Bay Packers

Coming off their win over the Texans, the Vikings stayed at home for a Week 10 NFC North rematch with the Green Bay Packers. In the first quarter, the Vikes drew first blood as Frerotte completed a 3-yard touchdown pass to Rice. The Packers responded with running back Ryan Grant getting a 1-yard touchdown run. In the second quarter, Minnesota increased their lead with former Packer Ryan Longwell kicking a 54-yard field goal, along with the Vikings picking up back-to-back safeties: first Aaron Rodgers gave away an intentional grounding penalty in his own endzone, before Vikings defensive end Jared Allen sacked Rodgers in his own endzone for the second. Green Bay closed out the half with Crosby getting a 47-yard field goal.

In the third quarter, the Vikes increased their lead as Frerotte completed a 47-yard touchdown pass to Taylor. However, the Packers took the lead as safety Nick Collins returned an interception 59 yards for a touchdown, before Blackmon scored his second punt return touchdown of the season against the Vikings, returning one 65 yards. In the fourth quarter, the Packers increased their lead as Crosby nailed a 40-yard field goal. The Vikings regained the lead as Peterson got a 29-yard touchdown run. Green Bay did manage to get a late drive going, yet Crosby's 52-yard field goal attempt sailed wide right, preserving head coach Brad Childress's first win over the Packers.

With the win, the Vikings improved to 5–4.

Week 11: at Tampa Bay Buccaneers

Coming off their divisional home win over the Packers, the Vikings flew to Raymond James Stadium for a Week 11 duel with the Tampa Bay Buccaneers. In the first quarter, the Vikings struck first as Longwell got a 43-yard field goal. The Buccaneers responded with kicker Matt Bryant getting a 39-yard field goal. In the second quarter, Minnesota answered with Frerotte completing a 4-yard touchdown pass to wide receiver Bobby Wade. Tampa Bay replied with Bryant making a 26-yard field goal. The Vikings closed out the half with Longwell getting a 26-yard field goal.

In the third quarter, the Buccaneers tied the game with FB B. J. Askew getting a 1-yard touchdown run. In the fourth quarter, Tampa Bay took the lead as Bryant nailed a 29-yard and a 26-yard field goal. Minnesota tried to rally, but the Buccaneers' defense was too much to overcome.

With the loss, the Vikings fell to 5–5.

Week 12: at Jacksonville Jaguars

Hoping to rebound from their road loss to the Buccaneers, the Vikings flew to Jacksonville Municipal Stadium for a Week 12 interconference duel with the Jacksonville Jaguars. In the first quarter, the Vikes got off to a fast start as linebacker Napoleon Harris returned a fumble 27 yards for a touchdown, while Taylor got a 3-yard touchdown run. The Jaguars responded with quarterback David Garrard completing an 8-yard touchdown pass to wide receiver Reggie Williams. Minnesota answered with a 54-yard field goal from Longwell. In the second quarter, Jacksonville got the period's only points as kicker Josh Scobee made a 21-yard field goal.

In the third quarter, the Vikings replied with Longwell making a 32-yard field goal. In the fourth quarter, Minnesota pulled away as Longwell nailed a 22-yard field goal, while Peterson got a 16-yard touchdown run. Afterwards, the Jaguars were given a safety when Vikings punter Chris Kluwe ran out of the back of his endzone.

With the win, Minnesota improved to 6–5.

Week 13: vs. Chicago Bears

Coming off their road win over the Jaguars, the Vikings went home, donned their throwback uniforms, and played a Week 13 NFC North rematch with the Chicago Bears, with first place in the division on the line. In the first quarter, Chicago struck first, with quarterback Kyle Orton completing a 65-yard touchdown pass to wide receiver Devin Hester. The Vikings responded in the second quarter with Longwell getting a 23-yard field goal. Later in the quarter, the Vikings defense came up big with a goal-line stand. Defensive end Jared Allen made the key tackle just an inch short of the end zone on fourth-and-goal. On the very next play, Frerotte ran a play-action fake from his own endzone and found former Bear Bernard Berrian for a 99-yard touchdown pass. This tied an NFL record for the longest pass from scrimmage and it was the first-ever longest offensive touchdown play in franchise history. It was also the 11th time in NFL history that a 99-yard play was made. Then, with 1:09 left until halftime, Frerotte found tight end Jim Kleinsasser for a 21-yard gain to just inside the one-yard line. The play was originally ruled a touchdown, but was officially reviewed and it was determined that he was just short of the goal line. On the next play however, Frerotte got the touchdown on a 1-yard quarterback sneak with 44 seconds left until the half.

In the third quarter, both teams traded blows. The Bears answered a 2-yard touchdown pass from Orton to running back Matt Forté, while Minnesota answered with a 21-yard touchdown run from Taylor. In the fourth quarter, the Vikes pulled away as Peterson got a 1-yard touchdown run, while Longwell nailed a 27-yard field goal.

With the win, the Vikings improved to 7–5 and took first place in the NFC North for the first time since early in the 2007 season.

Week 14: at Detroit Lions

Fresh off their divisional home win over the Bears on Sunday night, the Vikings flew to Ford Field for a Week 14 NFC North rematch with the winless Detroit Lions. Minnesota went behind late in the first quarter, as Lions kicker Jason Hanson made a 25-yard field goal. In the second quarter, Detroit increased its lead as Hanson made a 23-yard field goal. The Vikings closed the gap to three points with a 35-yard field goal from Longwell with just under 5 minutes left in the first half; however, a second interception of the game for Frerotte meant he was pulled at half-time in favor of Tarvaris Jackson.

In the third quarter, Minnesota took the lead as Taylor got a 17-yard touchdown run. The Lions replied with quarterback Daunte Culpepper (a former Viking) completing a 70-yard touchdown pass to Calvin Johnson. In the fourth quarter, the Vikings regained the lead as Jackson completed an 11-yard touchdown pass to Shiancoe. Detroit tried to rally as Hanson made a 39-yard field goal, but Longwell helped Minnesota pull away with a 50-yard field goal, his fifth successful kick of the season from 50 yards or more.

With the win, the Vikings improved to 8–5.

Week 15: at Arizona Cardinals

Coming off their hotly contested road win over the Lions, the Vikings flew to the desert for a Week 15 duel with the newly crowned NFC West champion Arizona Cardinals. Quarterback Tarvaris Jackson returned to the starting line-up for the first time since the Vikings' Week 2 loss to the Indianapolis Colts. Early in the first quarter, the Vikings got on the board first with a punt returned 82 yards by Berrian for a touchdown. Later in the first quarter, the Vikings increased their lead with Jackson completing a 41-yard touchdown pass to Berrian. The Vikings closed out the first quarter with Jackson completing a 6-yard touchdown pass to Rice. In the second quarter, the Vikings increased their lead with an 11-yard touchdown pass from Jackson to Taylor for the only score of the period.

In the third quarter, Arizona tried to rally as quarterback Kurt Warner completed a 50-yard touchdown pass to wide receiver Jerheme Urban. Later in the quarter, the Vikings tried to put the game away with a 34-yard field goal by kicker Ryan Longwell, only to have it blocked and Arizona returning it 62 yards for a touchdown by cornerback Roderick Hood. Finally, the Vikings put the game away for good with Jackson completing a 59-yard touchdown pass to wide receiver Bobby Wade. Arizona tried to rally in the final minutes of the game, but on first-and-goal, they ran out of time.

With the win, the Vikings improved to 9–5 and to a one-game lead over the Bears in the NFC North. If the Vikings won in week 16 against Atlanta or Chicago lost against Green Bay, the Vikings clinched their 17th division title, and their first since 2000.

Week 16 vs. Atlanta Falcons

Coming off their road rout of the Cardinals, the Vikings went home for a Week 16 battle with the Atlanta Falcons; a win gave the Vikings their first division title since 2000, and their first NFC North title. Minnesota trailed early in the first quarter as Falcons running back Michael Turner got a 1-yard touchdown run. The Vikings responded with a 21-yard touchdown pass from Jackson to Shiancoe. However, Atlanta answered in the second quarter with quarterback Matt Ryan completing an 8-yard touchdown pass to running back Jerious Norwood, followed by kicker Jason Elam's 22-yard field goal.

The Falcons further increased their lead in the third quarter as offensive guard Justin Blalock recovered Ryan's fumble in the endzone for a touchdown. In the fourth quarter, Minnesota tried to rally as Longwell nailed a 29-yard field goal, followed by Jackson's 17-yard touchdown pass to Shiancoe. However, Atlanta's defense prevented any further comeback from happening.

With the loss, the Vikings fell to 9–6.

Week 17 vs. New York Giants

Coming into their final game of the season against the New York Giants, the Vikings needed a win or a Chicago Bears loss to clinch the NFC North division title. The scoring began early in the second quarter when Longwell kicked a 48-yard field goal for the Vikings. They continued the scoring with a 67-yard run by Peterson, the second longest of his career to date. The Giants responded with a 51-yard John Carney field goal. The Giants continued the scoring with two John Carney field goals from 30 and 42 yards respectively to round out the end of the second quarter.

In the third quarter, the Giants took the lead when David Carr threw a 23-yard pass to Domenik Hixon, then added a 20-yard John Carney field goal early in the fourth quarter, making for a Giants nine-point lead. The Vikings came back with a 54-yard pass from Jackson to Berrian and clinched the win when Ryan Longwell nailed a 50-yard, game-winning field goal as time expired.

With the victory, the Vikings finished the regular season at 10–6, winning their first division title since 2000 and earning their first playoff berth since 2004.

Standings

Postseason

Schedule

Game summaries

NFC Wildcard Round: vs. Philadelphia Eagles

Entering the postseason as the NFC's third seed, the Vikings began their playoff run at home against the sixth-seed Philadelphia Eagles and for the first time in eight years, the Vikings hosted a playoff game. Minnesota trailed early as Eagles kicker David Akers got a 43-yard and a 51-yard field goal. The Vikings responded in the second quarter as Peterson got a 40-yard touchdown run. However, Philadelphia answered with Akers' 31-yard field goal, followed by cornerback Asante Samuel's 44-yard interception return for a touchdown. Minnesota ended the half with a 3-yard touchdown run from Peterson.

After a scoreless third quarter, the Eagles increased their lead in the fourth quarter with quarterback Donovan McNabb's 71-yard touchdown pass to running back Brian Westbrook, followed by an Akers 45-yard field goal. Try as they might, the Vikings were unable to build any momentum to mount a rally.

With the loss, the Vikings' season ended with an overall record of 10–7.

Statistics

Team leaders

League rankings

Staff

Roster

References

Minnesota Vikings seasons
Minnesota
NFC North championship seasons
Minnesota